Salah El-Dine Nessim was an Egyptian basketball player. He competed in the men's tournament at the 1948 Summer Olympics.

References

External links
 

Year of birth missing
Possibly living people
Egyptian men's basketball players
Olympic basketball players of Egypt
Basketball players at the 1948 Summer Olympics